Manulea flavociliata is a moth of the family Erebidae. It is found in north-eastern Kazakhstan, southern Siberia, the Russian Far East, Mongolia, China (Heilongjiang, Beijing, Shanxi, Shaanxi, Sichuan, Tibet, Qinghai, Xinjiang) and Korea.

Subspecies
Manulea flavociliata flavociliata (Siberia, Russian Far East)
Manulea flavociliata mienshanica (Daniel, 1954) (China)
Manulea flavociliata tibeta (Daniel, 1954) (Tibet)

References

Moths described in 1853
Lithosiina
Moths of Japan